Tyren Arendse (born 31 December 1980 in Cape Town, Western Cape) is a South African football (soccer) midfielder for National First Division club Engen Santos and South Africa.

He is from Elsie's River on the Cape Flats.

International goals

External links
 

1980 births
Association football midfielders
Living people
Mamelodi Sundowns F.C. players
Orlando Pirates F.C. players
Sportspeople from Cape Town
South African soccer players
Cape Coloureds
Santos F.C. (South Africa) players
South Africa international soccer players